The International Centre for Theoretical Physics Prize, ICTP Prize,  worth 3000 Euros is awarded to a young (under 40) physicist or mathematician from a developing country to promote theoretical mathematics and physics research in the developing world. Awardees include notable scientists from India, China, Brazil, Argentina and many other countries.

Recent winners
2022 Shant Baghram and Mohammad Hossein Namjoo
2021 Rondrotiana Barimalala and Narendra Ojha
2020 Dibyendu Roy and Mehdi Kargarian
2019 Basudeb Dasgupta and Suvrat Raju
2018 Luis E. F. Foa Torres and Hongjun Xiang
2017 Emilio Kropff
2016 Aninda Sinha
2015 Aijun Ding and Vijayakumar S. Nair
2014 Pablo Cornaglia
2013 Yasaman Farzan and Patchanita Thamyongkit
2012 Pablo Mininni
2011 Ado Jorio
2010 Shiraz Minwalla
2009 Marcelo Barreiro
2008 Abhishek Dhar and Zhong Fang
2007 M.M. Sheikh-Jabbari
1998 Anamaría Font and Fernando Quevedo
1975 Noor Muhammad Butt

Source: ICTP Prize Official website

See also
 Abdus Salam International Centre for Theoretical Physics (ICTP)

References

External links
 International Centre for Theoretical Physics

Academic awards